Discrepancy of hypergraphs is an area of discrepancy theory.

Definitions 

In the classical setting, we aim at partitioning the vertices of a hypergraph  into two classes in such a way that ideally each hyperedge contains the same number of vertices in both classes. A partition into two classes can be represented by a coloring . We call −1 and +1 colors. The color-classes  and  form the corresponding partition. For a hyperedge , set

These notions as well as the term 'discrepancy' seem to have appeared for the first time in a paper of Beck. Earlier results on this problem include the famous lower bound on the discrepancy of arithmetic progressions by Roth and upper bounds for this problem and other results by Erdős and Spencer and Sárközi (described on p. 39). At that time, discrepancy problems were called quasi-Ramsey problems.

Examples 
To get some intuition for this concept, let's have a look at a few examples.

 If all edges of  intersect trivially, i.e.  for any two distinct edges , then the discrepancy is zero, if all edges have even cardinality, and one, if there is an odd cardinality edge.
 The other extreme is marked by the complete hypergraph . Any 2-coloring will have a color class of at least this size, and this set is also an edge. It seems that the discrepancy reflects how chaotic the hyperedges of  intersect. Things are not that easy, however, as the following example shows.
In words,  is the hypergraph on 4k vertices {1,...,4k}, whose edges are all subsets that have the same number of elements in {1,...,2k} as in {2k+1,...,4k}. Now  has many (more than ) complicatedly intersecting edges. However, its discrepancy is zero, since we can color {1,...,2k} in one color and {2k+1,...,4k} in another color.

The last example shows that we cannot expect to determine the discrepancy by looking at a single parameter like the number of hyperedges. Still, the size of the hypergraph yields first upper bounds.

Bounds on the discrepancy

General hypergraphs 
1. For any hypergraph    with n vertices and m edges:

The proof is a simple application of the probabilistic method:
Let  be a random coloring, i.e. we have

independently for all . Since  is a sum of independent −1, 1 random variables. Put  for convenience. Then

Since a random coloring with positive probability has discrepancy at most , in particular, there are colorings that have discrepancy at most . Hence 

2. For any hypergraph    with n vertices and m edges such that :

 

To prove this, a much more sophisticated approach using the entropy function was necessary.
In the case ,  can be shown for n large enough. Therefore, this result is usually known to as 'Six Standard Deviations Suffice'. It is considered to be one of the milestones of discrepancy theory. The entropy method has seen numerous other applications, e.g. in the proof of the tight upper bound for the arithmetic progressions of Matoušek and Spencer or the upper bound in terms of the primal shatter function due to Matoušek.

Hypergraphs of bounded degree 
.

This result, the Beck–Fiala theorem, is due to Beck and Fiala. It is a famous open problem whether this bound can be improved asymptotically (modified versions of the original proof give 2t−1 or even 2t−3). 

Beck and Fiala conjectured that , but little progress has been made so far in this direction. A corollary of Beck's paper – the first time the notion of discrepancy explicitly appeared – shows  for some constant C.  The latest improvement in this direction is due to Banaszczyk: .

Permutations hypergraphs 
Suppose p1, ...,pm  are permutations of [n]. Suppose  is the hypergraph on [n] whose edges are all the intervals of every permutation. For example, if one of the permutations is (1,2,3,4), then the hypergraph  contains e.g. the edges (1,2), (1,2,3), (2,3), (2,3,4), etc. Then:

 For any two permutations, .
 For any m permutations, and such a coloring can be computed efficiently.
For any three permutations, Beck conjectures that . More precisely, for any {1,-1} coloring, if the sum of all colors is d, then there exists some integer q such that, in all three permutations, the sum of the first q colors is at most . This has implications for the bin packing problem.

Other classic theorems 

 Axis-parallel rectangles in the plane (Roth, Schmidt)
 Discrepancy of half-planes (Alexander, Matoušek)
 Arithmetic progressions (Roth, Sárközy, Beck, Matoušek & Spencer)
 Six Standard Deviations Suffice (Spencer)

Major open problems 

 Axis-parallel rectangles in dimensions three and higher (Folklore)
 Komlós Conjecture

Applications 

 Numerical Integration: Monte Carlo methods in high dimensions.
 Computational Geometry: Divide and conquer algorithms.
 Image Processing: Halftoning

Notes

References 
 
 
 
 

Diophantine approximation
Unsolved problems in mathematics
Discrepancy theory
Hypergraphs